Humpty Dumpty is a nursery rhyme and the name of its principal character.

Humpty Dumpty may also refer to:
 Humpty Dumpty (pinball), a pinball machine
 Humpty Dumpty Snack Foods, a snack food manufacturer
 Humpty Dumpty (magazine), a children's magazine
 Humpty Dumpty (comics), a fictional character from DC Comics
 "Humpty Dumpty" (House), an episode of TV series House
 Humpty Dumpty LSD, a compilation album by Butthole Surfers
 "Humpty Dumpty", a song by Aimee Mann on the album Lost in Space
 "Humpty Dumpty", a song by AJR on the album OK Orchestra
 A version of the song "The Ballad of Persse O'Reilly", recorded by the Dubliners as sung by Ronnie Drew
 GER Class T19 locomotive rebuilt 1902 to 1904, nicknamed "Humpty-Dumpties" due to their appearance
 "Humpty Dumpty!", an episode of the television series Teletubbies
 Humpty Dumpty function, another name for one way function